Heukseok (Chung-Ang Univ.) Station is a station on Line 9 of the Seoul Subway.

Prior to its opening, Sangdo Station in Line 7's subname was also Chung-Ang, but Heuskseok was near the Chung-Ang University. University Metro drivers and employers were conferenced, resulting in Sangdo Station's subname being removed. The subname 'Chung Ang Univ' is now in Heukseok.

Station layout

See also
Sangdo Station
Chung-Ang University

Railway stations opened in 2009
Seoul Metropolitan Subway stations
Metro stations in Dongjak District